Giordano Angelini (born 28 September 1939) is an Italian businessman and politician who served as Mayor of Ravenna (1980–1987), Deputy (1987–2001) and Undersecretary of State (1998–2001).

References

1939 births
Mayors of Ravenna
Deputies of Legislature X of Italy
Deputies of Legislature XI of Italy
Deputies of Legislature XII of Italy
Deputies of Legislature XIII of Italy
Living people
People from Ravenna
Italian Communist Party politicians
Democratic Party of the Left politicians